Lis Hartel (March 14, 1921 – February 12, 2009) was an equestrian from Denmark. She was originally coached by her mother, Else Holst, but began to be coached by professional horseman Gunnar Andersen when she became nationally competitive.

She was the Danish dressage champion in 1943 and 1944. In September 1944 at age 23 she contracted polio, which permanently paralyzed her below the knees, as well as affecting her arms and hands. She was pregnant at the time, but had a healthy daughter. Hartel was determined to continue her equestrian career despite medical advice otherwise, and in 1947 she finished second at the Scandinavian championships, although she had to be helped onto her horse when she rode.

Dressage at the Olympics was open only to commissioned military officers until 1952, and in that year Hartel was one of the first women to compete against men in an equestrian sport at the Olympics. Her silver medal in 1952 for Individual Dressage was the first by any woman in any individual sport when in direct competition with men at the Olympics, and she was also the Danish champion in dressage that year. She continued to be Danish champion in dressage in 1953, 1954, 1956 and 1959. In 1956 she also won another silver medal, this time at the 1956 Olympics in Melbourne, Australia (the Equestrian Games of those Olympics were held in Stockholm because of Australian quarantine laws for horses).

After retiring from competitive riding, Hartel gave demonstrations, raising money for polio sufferers and supporting therapeutic riding for people with disabilities. The Lis Hartel Foundation in the Netherlands, named after her, offers such riding opportunities.

In 1992 Hartel was inducted into Denmark's Hall of Fame, and in 2005 she was named one of Denmark's top 10 athletes of all time.

References

External links
Brief Bio for Lis Hartel

1921 births
2009 deaths
Danish female equestrians
Danish dressage riders
Equestrians at the 1952 Summer Olympics
Equestrians at the 1956 Summer Olympics
Olympic equestrians of Denmark
Olympic silver medalists for Denmark
Olympic medalists in equestrian
People with polio
Danish sportswomen
Medalists at the 1956 Summer Olympics
Medalists at the 1952 Summer Olympics